A menhir (from Brittonic languages: maen or men, "stone" and hir or hîr, "long"), standing stone, orthostat, or lith is a large upright stone, emplaced in the ground by humans, typically dating from the European middle Bronze Age. They can be found individually as monoliths, or as part of a group of similar stones. Menhirs' size can vary considerably, but they often taper toward the top. 

They are widely distributed across Europe, Africa and Asia, but are most numerous in Western Europe; particularly in Ireland, Great Britain, and Brittany, where there are about 50,000 examples, and northwestern France, where there are some 1,200 further examples. Standing stones are usually difficult to date. They were constructed during many different periods across prehistory as part of the larger megalithic cultures in Europe and near areas.

Some menhirs stand next to buildings that have an early or current religious significance. One example is the South Zeal Menhir in Devon, which formed the basis for a 12th-century monastery built by lay monks. The monastery later became the Oxenham Arms hotel, at South Zeal, and the standing stone remains in place in the snug bar at the hotel.

Where menhirs appear in groups, often in a circular, oval, henge or horseshoe formation, they are sometimes called megalithic monuments. These are sites of ancient religious ceremonies, sometimes containing burial chambers. The exact function of menhirs has provoked more debate than practically any other issue in European prehistory. Over the centuries, they have variously been thought to have been used by druids for human sacrifice, used as territorial markers, or elements of a complex ideological system, used as mnemonic systems for oral cultures, or functioning as early calendars. Until the nineteenth century, antiquarians did not have substantial knowledge of prehistory, and their only reference points were provided by classical literature. The developments of radiocarbon dating and dendrochronology have significantly advanced scientific knowledge in this area.

The word menhir was adopted from French by 19th-century archaeologists. The introduction of the word into general archaeological usage has been attributed to the 18th-century French military officer Théophile Corret de la Tour d'Auvergne. It is a combination of two words of the Breton language: maen and hir. In modern Welsh, they are described as maen hir, or "long stone". In modern Breton, the word peulvan is used, with peul meaning "stake" or "post" and van which is a soft mutation of the word maen which means "stone". In Germany and Scandinavia the word Bauta is used (e.g., :de:Bautastein and :no:bautastein) and this occasionally makes its way into English with the term "bauta stone".

History
Almost nothing is known of the social organization or religious beliefs of the people who erected the menhirs. Their language is also unknown. It is known, however, that they buried their dead and had the skills to grow crops, farm and make pottery, stone tools and jewelry. Identifying the purpose or use of menhirs remains speculative. Until recently, standing stones were associated with the Beaker people, who inhabited Europe during the European late Neolithic and early Bronze Age—later third millennium BC, c. 2800–1800 BC. However, recent research into the age of megaliths in Brittany strongly suggests a far older origin, perhaps back to six to seven thousand years ago.

Many menhirs are engraved with megalithic art. This often turned them into anthropomorphic stelae, although images of objects such as stone axes, ploughs, shepherds' crooks, and yokes were common. With the exception of the stone axe, none of these motifs are definitely portraying what they are named after, and the name used to describe them is largely for convenience. Some menhirs were broken up and incorporated into later passage graves, where they had new megalithic art carved with little regard for the previous pictures. It is not known if this re-use was deliberate or if the passage grave builders just saw menhirs as a convenient source of stone (Le Roux 1992).

During the Middle Ages, standing stones were believed to have been built by the giants who lived before the biblical flood. Many of the megaliths were destroyed or defaced by early Christians; it is estimated that some 50,000 megaliths once stood in Northern Europe, where almost 10,000 now remain.

In 2019, four menhirs and nearly 1,000 small and big dolmens were found in India at the Pothamala hills at the Kerala-Tamil Nadu border.

Geographical distribution

It is believed that the practitioners of the megalithic faith travelled via the sea, as the mass majority of menhirs are located on coasts, islands, and peninsulas.

See also

. Also matzeva/mazzeva/maseba/masseba/massebah.

. Also stone alignment.
. Also ship setting.

Notes

References
Le Roux, C. T. 1992. "The Art of Gavrinis Presented in its Armorican Context and in Comparison with Ireland." in Journal of the Royal Society of Antiquaries of Ireland vol. 122, pp 79–108.

External links

Dolmens, Menhirs & Stones – Circles in the South of France – Menhirs of the "Cham des Bondons"
New Theory – Henges – Engineering in Prehistory
Rows of menhirs in Russia, South Ural
List of menhirs and their related stories in Czech Republic
Ancient Europe Placemarks Google Earth file downloads.
Skela menhirs in Ukraine 

 
Megalithic monuments
Sacred rocks
Stone monuments and memorials
Stone Age Europe